Vysokoye is a rural locality (a settlement) in Beryozovskoye Rural Settlement, Vorobyovsky District, Voronezh Oblast, Russia. The population was 56 as of 2010. There are 2 streets.

Geography 
Vysokoye is located 27 km northeast of Vorobyovka (the district's administrative centre) by road. Bannoye is the nearest rural locality.

References 

Rural localities in Vorobyovsky District